Bishop Kinkell is a small scattered crofting hamlet  1.5 miles south of Conon Bridge in Inverness-shire, Scottish Highlands and is in the Scottish council area of Highland.

References

Populated places on the Black Isle